= Platinum plan =

Platinum plan may refer to:

- An offering of the United States' Patient Protection and Affordable Care Act defined as covering 90 percent of out-of-pocket costs
- A travel insurance plan offered by American International Group
- Platinum Plan for Black America, a policy proposal by president Donald Trump unveiled in September 2020
